Kalanchwala railway station (Urdu and ) is located in Kalanchwala village, Bahawalpur district of Punjab province, Pakistan.

See also
 List of railway stations in Pakistan
 Pakistan Railways

References

External links

Railway stations in Bahawalpur District
Railway stations on Karachi–Peshawar Line (ML 1)